Anthony Jay Smith (born July 26, 1988) is an American professional mixed martial artist. He currently competes in the Light Heavyweight division in the Ultimate Fighting Championship (UFC). A professional competitor since 2008, Smith has also formerly competed for Strikeforce and Bellator.  As of January 24, 2023, he is #5 in the UFC light heavyweight rankings.

Background
Born in Corpus Christi, Texas, Smith grew up in Nebraska City. He was raised by his single mother and grandfather, as his dad was absent. He has stated that he is biracial. Smith dropped out of high school in the middle of his senior year. He started working full-time as a concrete finisher, which he continued until 2016.

Mixed martial arts career

Early career
Smith started his career in 2008 and fought mainly for local promotions in the midwestern United States. He compiled a professional record of 13–7, with wins against WEC veterans Logan Clark, Eric Schambari and losses to UFC veterans Jake Hecht and Jesse Forbes, before signing with Strikeforce.

Strikeforce
Smith made his Strikeforce debut on July 22, 2011, at Strikeforce Challengers: Bowling vs. Voelker III against Ben Lagman, replacing an injured Louis Taylor. He won via KO in the second round.

Smith faced Adlan Amagov on November 18, 2011, at Strikeforce Challengers: Britt vs. Sayers. He lost via KO in the first round.

Smith faced Lumumba Sayers on August 18, 2012, at Strikeforce: Rousey vs. Kaufman. He won via submission in the first round.

Smith faced Roger Gracie on January 12, 2013, at Strikeforce: Marquardt vs. Saffiedine. He lost via submission in the second round.

After the end of Strikeforce, Smith moved to UFC.

Ultimate Fighting Championship
In his debut, Smith faced Antônio Braga Neto on June 8, 2013, at UFC on Fuel TV 10. He lost the fight via kneebar submission in the first round. He was subsequently released from the UFC.

Bellator MMA
On April 18, 2014, Smith made his Bellator MMA debut facing Victor Moreno at Bellator 117 winning via triangle choke submission in the second round.

Smith faced Brian Green on October 17, 2014, at Bellator 129. He won the fight via unanimous decision.

Return to Ultimate Fighting Championship
On February 16, 2016 Smith was re-signed to the UFC. He faced promotional newcomer Leonardo Augusto Leleco on February 21, 2016, at UFC Fight Night 83, replacing an injured Trevor Smith. He won the fight via unanimous decision.

Smith was briefly scheduled to face Scott Askham on July 8, 2016, at The Ultimate Fighter 23 Finale. However, Askham pulled out of the bout on April 28 and was replaced by Cezar Ferreira. He lost the fight via unanimous decision.

Smith next faced Elvis Mutapčić on December 3, 2016, at The Ultimate Fighter 24 Finale. He won the fight via TKO in the second round and was awarded a Performance of the Night bonus.

Smith faced Andrew Sanchez on April 15, 2017, at UFC on Fox 24. He won the fight via knockout due to a combination of knee and punches in the third round.

Smith faced Héctor Lombard on September 16, 2017, at UFC Fight Night 116. He won the fight via technical knockout in the third round.

Smith faced Thiago Santos on February 3, 2018, at UFC Fight Night 125. He lost the fight via technical knockout. Both participants received a Fight of the Night bonus.

Move to Light Heavyweight Division
Smith faced former champion Rashad Evans in his light heavyweight debut on June 9, 2018, at UFC 225. He won the fight via knockout in the first round.

On short notice, Smith replaced Volkan Oezdemir, and faced yet another former champion in Maurício Rua on July 22, 2018, at UFC Fight Night 134 main event. He won the fight via knockout in the first round. This win earned him the Performance of the Night award.

In his third fight in five months, Smith faced Volkan Oezdemir on October 27, 2018, at UFC Fight Night 138. He won the fight by submission in the third round. This win earned him the second consecutive Performance of the Night award.

In the highest profile fight of his career, Smith faced Jon Jones for the UFC Light Heavyweight Championship on March 2, 2019, at UFC 235. He lost the fight via unanimous decision.

Smith faced Alexander Gustafsson on June 1, 2019 in the main event at UFC Fight Night 153. He won the fight via rear-naked choke submission in the fourth round. The win also earned Smith a Performance of the Night bonus award.

Smith was scheduled to face Glover Teixeira on April 25, 2020 at UFC Fight Night 173. However, on April 9, Dana White, the president of UFC announced that this event was postponed and rescheduled to May 13, 2020 at UFC Fight Night: Smith vs. Teixeira. Smith lost the fight via technical knockout in the fifth round.

Smith faced Aleksandar Rakić on August 29, 2020 at UFC Fight Night 175.  He lost the fight via unanimous decision.

Smith faced Devin Clark on November 28, 2020 at UFC on ESPN: Smith vs. Clark. He won the fight via a triangle choke submission in the first round.

Smith faced Jimmy Crute on April 24, 2021 at UFC 261. He won the fight by technical knockout before the second round after the doctor stopped the fight when Crute suffered foot drop as a result of a leg kick from Smith and was unable to continue.

Smith faced Ryan Spann on September 18, 2021 at UFC Fight Night 192. He won the fight via rear-naked choke submission in round one. This win earned him the Performance of the Night award.

Smith faced Magomed Ankalaev on July 30, 2022, at UFC 277. He lost the fight via technical knockout in the second round.

Smith was scheduled to face Jamahal Hill on March 11, 2023, at UFC Fight Night 221. However, Hill was pulled from the bout after being rebooked in favor of another fight.

Smith is scheduled to face Johnny Walker on May 13, 2023 at UFC Fight Night 224.

Championships and accomplishments
Ultimate Fighting Championship
Performance of the Night (Six times) 
Fight of the Night (One time)  vs. Thiago Santos
 Seventh highest finishes-per-win percentage in UFC history (10 finishes / 11 wins: 90.9%) 
Cage Fury Fighting Championships
CFFC Middleweight Championship (One time)
Victory Fighting Championships
Victory FC Middleweight Championship (One time)

Personal life
Smith is married. He has three daughters, born in 2011, 2014 and 2017.

Home invasion incident 
At 4am on April 5, 2020, an intruder gained entry to Smith's home in Nebraska through an opened garage door. Smith found him "screaming at the top of his lungs" in his computer room, and proceeded to fight the man for five minutes until the police arrived. Smith states that the intruder "took everything that I gave him – every punch, every knee, every elbow. He took every single one of them and kept fighting me", describing the ordeal "as one of the toughest fights" of his life. The man was later identified to be 21-year-old Luke Haberman, an accomplished former high school wrestler.

Mixed martial arts record

|Loss
|align=center|36–17
|Magomed Ankalaev
|TKO (punches)
|UFC 277
|
|align=center|2
|align=center|3:09
|Dallas, Texas, United States
|
|-
|Win
|align=center|36–16
|Ryan Spann
|Submission (rear-naked choke)
|UFC Fight Night: Smith vs. Spann
|
|align=center|1
|align=center|3:47
|Las Vegas, Nevada, United States
|
|-
|Win
|align=center|35–16
|Jimmy Crute
|TKO (doctor stoppage)
|UFC 261
|
|align=center|1
|align=center|5:00
|Jacksonville, Florida, United States
|
|-
|Win
|align=center|34–16
|Devin Clark
|Submission (triangle choke)
|UFC on ESPN: Smith vs. Clark
|
|align=center|1
|align=center|2:34
|Las Vegas, Nevada, United States
|
|-
|Loss
|align=center|33–16
|Aleksandar Rakić
|Decision (unanimous)
|UFC Fight Night: Smith vs. Rakić
|
|align=center|3
|align=center|5:00
|Las Vegas, Nevada, United States
|
|-
|Loss
|align=center|33–15
|Glover Teixeira
|TKO (punches)
|UFC Fight Night: Smith vs. Teixeira
|
|align=center|5
|align=center|1:04
|Jacksonville, Florida, United States
|
|-
|Win
|align=center| 33–14
|Alexander Gustafsson
|Submission (rear-naked choke)
|UFC Fight Night: Gustafsson vs. Smith 
|
|align=center|4
|align=center|2:38
|Stockholm, Sweden
|
|-
|Loss
|align=center| 32–14
|Jon Jones
|Decision (unanimous)
|UFC 235
|
|align=center|5
|align=center|5:00
|Las Vegas, Nevada, United States
|
|-
|Win
|align=center| 32–13
|Volkan Oezdemir
|Submission (rear-naked choke)
|UFC Fight Night: Volkan vs. Smith
|
|align=center|3
|align=center|4:26
|Moncton, New Brunswick, Canada
|
|-
|Win
|align=center| 31–13
|Maurício Rua
|KO (elbow and punches)
|UFC Fight Night: Shogun vs. Smith
|
|align=center|1
|align=center|1:29
|Hamburg, Germany
|
|-
|Win
|align=center|30–13
|Rashad Evans
|KO (knee)
|UFC 225
|
|align=center|1
|align=center|0:53
|Chicago, Illinois, United States
|
|-
|Loss
|align=center|29–13
|Thiago Santos
|TKO (body kick and punches)
|UFC Fight Night: Machida vs. Anders
|
|align=center|2
|align=center|1:03
|Belém, Brazil
|
|-
|Win
|align=center|29–12
|Héctor Lombard
|KO (punch)
|UFC Fight Night: Rockhold vs. Branch
|
|align=center|3
|align=center|2:33
|Pittsburgh, Pennsylvania, United States
|
|-
|Win
|align=center|28–12
|Andrew Sanchez
|KO (head kick and punches)
|UFC on Fox: Johnson vs. Reis
|
|align=center|3
|align=center|3:52
|Kansas City, Missouri, United States
|
|-
|Win
|align=center|27–12
|Elvis Mutapčić
|TKO (elbow and punches)
|The Ultimate Fighter: Tournament of Champions Finale
|
|align=center|2
|align=center|3:27
|Las Vegas, Nevada, United States
|
|-
|Loss
|align=center|26–12
|Cezar Ferreira
|Decision (unanimous)
|The Ultimate Fighter: Team Joanna vs. Team Cláudia Finale
|
|align=center|3
|align=center|5:00
|Las Vegas, Nevada, United States
|
|-
| Win
| align=center| 26–11
| Leonardo Augusto Guimarães
| Decision (unanimous)
| UFC Fight Night: Cowboy vs. Cowboy
| 
| align=center| 3
| align=center| 5:00
| Pittsburgh, Pennsylvania, United States
|
|-
| Win
| align=center| 25–11
| Josh Neer
| TKO (punches)
| Victory FC 47
| 
| align=center| 1
| align=center| 3:27
| Omaha, Nebraska, United States
| 
|-
| Win
| align=center| 24–11
| Brock Jardine
| TKO (punches)
| RFA 30: Smith vs. Jardine
| 
| align=center| 1
| align=center| 3:00
| Lincoln, Nebraska, United States
| 
|-
| Win
| align=center| 23–11
| Tim Williams
| TKO (knee)
| Cage Fury FC 50: Williams vs. Smith II
| 
| align=center| 1
| align=center| 1:02
| Atlantic City, New Jersey, United States
| 
|-
| Win
| align=center| 22–11
| Tim Williams
| Submission (inverted triangle choke)
| Cage Fury FC 46: Williams vs. Smith
| 
| align=center| 2
| align=center| 1:15
| Chester, Pennsylvania, United States
| 
|-
| Win
| align=center| 21–11
| Andrew Kapel
| Submission (rear-naked choke)
| Extreme Beatdown: Beatdown at 4 Bears 12
| 
| align=center| 1
| align=center| 2:18
| New Town, North Dakota, United States
| 
|-
| Win
| align=center| 20–11
| Brian Green
| Decision (unanimous)
| Bellator 129
| 
| align=center| 3
| align=center| 5:00
| Council Bluffs, Iowa, United States
| 
|-
| Win
| align=center| 19–11
| Victor Moreno
| Submission (triangle choke)
| Bellator 117
| 
| align=center| 2
| align=center| 0:59
| Council Bluffs, Iowa, United States
| 
|-
| Loss
| align=center| 18–11
| Josh Neer
| Submission (rear-naked choke)
| Victory FC 41
| 
| align=center| 3
| align=center| 3:48
| Ralston, Nebraska, United States
| 
|-
| Loss
| align=center| 18–10
| Antônio Braga Neto
| Submission (kneebar)
| UFC on Fuel TV: Nogueira vs. Werdum
| 
| align=center| 1
| align=center| 1:52
| Fortaleza, Brazil
| 
|-
| Loss
| align=center| 18–9
| Roger Gracie
| Submission (arm-triangle choke)
| Strikeforce: Marquardt vs. Saffiedine
| 
| align=center| 2
| align=center| 3:16
| Oklahoma City, Oklahoma, United States
| 
|-
| Win
| align=center| 18–8
| Lumumba Sayers
| Submission (triangle choke)
| Strikeforce: Rousey vs. Kaufman
| 
| align=center| 1
| align=center| 3:52
| San Diego, California, United States
| 
|-
| Win
| align=center| 17–8
| Richard White
| TKO (punches)
| Disorderly Conduct: Fireworks
| 
| align=center| 1
| align=center| 2:35
| Nebraska City, Nebraska, United States
| 
|-
| Win
| align=center| 16–8
| Ian Berg
| Submission (arm-triangle choke)
| Victory FC 37
| 
| align=center| 2
| align=center| 2:01
| Council Bluffs, Iowa, United States
| 
|-
| Loss
| align=center| 15–8
| Adlan Amagov
| KO (punches)
| Strikeforce Challengers: Britt vs. Sayers
| 
| align=center| 1
| align=center| 2:32
| Las Vegas, Nevada, United States
|
|-
| Win
| align=center| 15–7
| Ben Lagman
| KO (punch)
| Strikeforce Challengers: Voelker vs. Bowling III
| 
| align=center| 2
| align=center| 0:33
| Las Vegas, Nevada, United States
| 
|-
| Win
| align=center| 14–7
| Curtis Johnson
| KO (punches)
| Cornhusker Fight Club 6: Slugfest
| 
| align=center| 1
| align=center| 3:13
| Lincoln, Nebraska, United States
| 
|-
| Win
| align=center| 13–7
| Eric Schambari
| TKO (punches)
| C3 Fights: MMA Championship Fights
| 
| align=center| 1
| align=center| 1:46
| Concho, Oklahoma, United States
| 
|-
| Win
| align=center| 12–7
| Matt Gabel
| Submission (triangle choke)
| Extreme Challenge 181
| 
| align=center| 1
| align=center| 1:50
| Council Bluffs, Iowa, United States
| 
|-
| Win
| align=center| 11–7
| Demetrius Richards
| TKO (punches)
| Extreme Challenge: Bad Blood
| 
| align=center| 2
| align=center| 2:07
| Council Bluffs, Iowa, United States
| 
|-
| Win
| align=center| 10–7
| Ben Crowder
| KO (punch)
| Cornhusker Fight Club 2: Season's Beatings
| 
| align=center| 1
| align=center| 1:09
| Lincoln, Nebraska, United States
| 
|-
| Loss
| align=center| 9–7
| Jesse Forbes
| TKO (punches)
| Crowbar MMA: Fall Brawl
| 
| align=center| 2
| align=center| 1:28
| Fargo, North Dakota, United States
| 
|-
| Win
| align=center| 9–6
| Logan Clark
| TKO (doctor stoppage)
| Seconds Out / Vivid MMA: Havoc at the Hyatt 2
| 
| align=center| 2
| align=center| 2:22
| Minneapolis, Minnesota, United States
| 
|-
| Win
| align=center| 8–6
| Lucas St. Claire
| Submission (armbar)
| Max Fights 10
| 
| align=center| 1
| align=center| 3:19
| East Grand Forks, Minnesota, United States
| 
|-
| Win
| align=center| 7–6
| Mike George
| KO (punch)
| TriState Cage Fights: Island Warfare
| 
| align=center| 1
| align=center| 0:22
| Grand Island, Nebraska, United States
| 
|-
| Win
| align=center| 6–6
| James Brasco
| TKO (doctor stoppage)
| XKL Evolution 1
| 
| align=center| 1
| align=center| 1:21
| Ypsilanti, Michigan, United States
| 
|-
| Loss
| align=center| 5–6
| Jake Hecht
| TKO (punches)
| Victory FC 30: Night of Champions
| 
| align=center| 3
| align=center| 4:35
| Council Bluffs, Iowa, United States
| 
|-
| Loss
| align=center| 5–5
| Mike Pitz
| TKO (punches)
| Fight Club Inc.
| 
| align=center| 2
| align=center| 3:21
| Addison, Illinois, United States
| 
|-
| Loss
| align=center| 5–4
| Chaun Sims
| TKO (punches)
| Fight To Win: Colorado vs. Nebraska
| 
| align=center| 2
| align=center| 2:00
| Denver, Colorado, United States
| 
|-
| Loss
| align=center| 5–3
| Brian Monahan
| Submission (armbar)
| Victory FC 26: Onslaught
| 
| align=center| 1
| align=center| N/A
| Council Bluffs, Iowa, United States
| 
|-
| Win
| align=center| 5–2
| Rico Washington Sr.
| TKO (punches)
| Minnesota Combat Sports
| 
| align=center| 1
| align=center| 0:54
| Maplewood, Minnesota, United States
| 
|-
| Loss
| align=center| 4–2
| Charley Lynch
| TKO (punches)
| Brutaal: Fight Night
| 
| align=center| 1
| align=center| 3:12
| Maplewood, Minnesota, United States
| 
|-
| Win
| align=center| 4–1
| Chuck Parmelee
| Submission (choke)
| Torment MMA
| 
| align=center| 2
| align=center| 1:26
| Lincoln, Nebraska, United States
| 
|-
| Loss
| align=center| 3–1
| Chuck Parmelee
| TKO (punches)
| TriState Cage Fights
| 
| align=center| 2
| align=center| N/A
| Yankton, South Dakota, United States
| 
|-
| Win
| align=center| 3–0
| Ricky Duvall
| KO (punch)
| Victory FC 23: Validation
| 
| align=center| N/A
| align=center| N/A
| Council Bluffs, Iowa, United States
| 
|-
| Win
| align=center| 2–0
| Jeremy Shepherd
| Submission (choke)
| Pugilistic Productions
| 
| align=center| 2
| align=center| 2:13
| Lincoln, Nebraska, United States
| 
|-
| Win
| align=center| 1–0
| Dave Moran
| Submission (armbar)
| Victory FC 22: Ascension
| 
| align=center| 2
| align=center| 1:19
| Sioux City, Iowa, United States
|

See also
List of current UFC fighters
List of Bellator MMA alumni
List of Strikeforce alumni
List of male mixed martial artists

References

External links

1988 births
Living people
African-American mixed martial artists
American male mixed martial artists
Middleweight mixed martial artists
People from Corpus Christi, Texas
Mixed martial artists from Nebraska
Light heavyweight mixed martial artists
Mixed martial artists utilizing Brazilian jiu-jitsu
Ultimate Fighting Championship male fighters
21st-century African-American sportspeople
American practitioners of Brazilian jiu-jitsu
People awarded a black belt in Brazilian jiu-jitsu
20th-century African-American people